Black Turn Brook State Forest covers   in Norton, Vermont in Essex County near the Canadian border. The forest is managed by the Vermont Department of Forests, Parks, and Recreation. The parcel is adjacent to the Coaticook River and access is via a right-of-way across privately owned property. 

Activities in the forest include hiking, hunting, primitive camping, cross-country skiing and walking.

History
Black Turn Brook State Forest was established in 1994 when the state received 592 acres of land that was formerly known as Earth Peoples Park, which had been seized by the U.S. Government.

References

External links
Official website

Vermont state forests
Protected areas of Essex County, Vermont
Norton, Vermont
Protected areas established in 1994
1994 establishments in Vermont